Bryan Bouffier (born 1 December 1978) is French rally driver. He is currently competing in the European Rally Championship with a Citroën DS3 S2000. He won the 2011 Monte Carlo Rally and the 2013 Tour de Corse.

Career
In 2002 Bouffier won the Volant Peugeot 206 championship. In 2003 he became an official Peugeot Sport driver and spent three years competing in the French tarmac championship in a Peugeot 206 S1600. In 2006 he competed in the European Rally Championship for Peugeot Sport España, winning the Rally Antibes and finishing fifth in the standings.

Bouffier won three consecutive Polish Rally Championships in 2007, 2008 and 2009, driving a Peugeot 207 S2000 for Peugeot Sport Polska (2007–2008) and Mitsubishi Lancer Evo IX (2009). In 2010 he became French Rally Champion in the 207 S2000.

Bouffier is competing in the Intercontinental Rally Challenge in 2011 in a 207 S2000 for Peugeot France. He won the season opening Monte Carlo Rally after climbing from seventh to first when he made better tyre choices than his rivals in sudden snowfall.

Results

WRC results

 Season still in progress

JWRC results

WRC-2 results

WRC 3 results

IRC results

† Ineligible to score points.

European Rally Championship results

References

External links

 

Living people
1978 births
French rally drivers
World Rally Championship drivers
Intercontinental Rally Challenge drivers
European Rally Championship drivers
Peugeot Sport drivers
Hyundai Motorsport drivers
M-Sport drivers